Geraldine Mary Quinn (born 7 June 1975) is a songwriter, guitarist, singer, comedian and actor based in Melbourne, Australia. She won the Best Emerging Cabaret Artiste award at the 2006 Green Room Awards (Australia), and was nominated for Original Songs.

Personal and early life 
Quinn was born in Wagga Wagga, New South Wales and moved to Melbourne with her family at a young age. She attended St John's Regional College between 1987 and 1992. She trained as an actor at National Theatre Drama School.

Career 
Quinn has appeared on Australian TV shows Spicks and Specks, RocKwiz, Adam Hills Tonight, The Comedy Channel and Upper Middle Bogan.  In 2007, 2008 and 2015, Quinn toured with Melbourne International Comedy Festival Roadshow and she is a regular guest on ABC Radio's The Conversation Hour (Australia). She has performed solo shows SEXDEATHBOWIE, Bad Ambassador, Hex and the City and Shut Up and Sing in the Melbourne International Comedy Festival, Adelaide Fringe Festival and Edinburgh Festival Fringe.  In 2007 Quinn performed at The Famous Spiegeltent with Paul Kelly in a celebration of his songs by leading cabaret artists including Eddie Perfect, Camille O'Sullivan, Paul Capsis and Debra Byrne. She has also toured live solo shows at the Sydney Big Laugh Comedy Festival, Bangalow Arts Festival, Brisbane Cabaret Festival, Melbourne Cabaret Festival, New Zealand International Comedy Festival, Perth FRINGE WORLD Festival and Adelaide Cabaret Festival. Quinn released her solo albums A Quick One and Scream 'Jarvis Cocker' When You're Losing.

In the 2010 Melbourne International Comedy Festival, Quinn was nominated for the Golden Gibbo Award (Best Independent Local Production) for her solo production Shut Up and Sing. Shut Up and Sing went on to be nominated in the 2010 Victorian Green Room Awards for Best Cabaret Production, Best Cabaret Artiste and Original Songs.

Quinn is a two-time recipient of the Brian McCarthy Memorial Moosehead Award for the development of her 2011 show You're the Voice: Songs for the Ordinary by an Anthemaniac (directed by Casey Bennetto writer of Keating!) and her 2014 show MDMA: Modern Day Maiden Aunt (directed by Justin Hamilton). You're the Voice went on to win the 2011 Melbourne International Comedy Festival's Golden Gibbo Award for Best Independent Local Production. It was the second year running Quinn had been nominated for the award. You're the Voice and the follow up The Last Gig in Melbourne were nominated for Best Cabaret Artiste, Best Cabaret Production and won for Original Songs in the 2011 Green Room Awards.

In 2014 she was nominated for her third Green Room Award for Best Cabaret Artiste for Sunglasses at Night: The 80s Apocalypse Sing Along Cabaret. Her 2013 production Stranger was also nominated for Stand Out Performer and Best Music in the 2014 New Zealand Fringe Festival. The following year, MDMA: Modern Day Maiden Aunt dominated the Green Room Awards with four nominations for Best Cabaret, Best Artiste, Original Songs and Best Writing, as well as a nomination for her collaborative cabaret with Perth musician Michael de Grussa All Out of Pride: An Evening of Songs You're Ashamed to Love (Best Cabaret). Quinn took away the award for Best Cabaret Artiste (2014). MDMA was also nominated for Best Cabaret, Best Stand Up, Best Comedy and Outstanding Performer in the 2015 New Zealand Fringe Festival, winning Best Cabaret.

In July 2015, Quinn was asked to perform at the opening of the David Bowie Is exhibition in Melbourne.

Discography
A Quick One (2006)
Scream 'Jarvis Cocker' When You're Losing (2009)
You're the Voice: Songs for the Ordinary by an Anthemaniac (2013)
MDMA: Modern Day Maiden Aunt (2015)

References

External links 
 Artist's website
 Chortle.co.uk
 The Green Room Awards Association
 Who's Who of Australian Women
 Fitroyalty (2008)
 'Home ground has comic advantage' The Age, 11 April 2010
 Top Lineup of Funny Women at Upfront Gala (MICF 2014)

1975 births
Living people
Australian women comedians
People from Wagga Wagga
Comedians from Melbourne
21st-century Australian comedians